Memnun Suljagić (born 16 February 1966) is a retired Bosnian professional footballer and youth coach. As a player, he represented FK Sarajevo, and was a member of the 1998–99 title winning side.

International career
He made one appearance for Bosnia and Herzegovina, in an August 1999 friendly match against Liechtenstein.

References

External links
 
 

1966 births
Living people
Footballers from Sarajevo
Association football defenders
Yugoslav footballers
Bosnia and Herzegovina footballers
Bosnia and Herzegovina international footballers
FK Sarajevo players
Yugoslav First League players
Premier League of Bosnia and Herzegovina players